Frank David Smith (27 July 1936 – June 2015) was an English professional footballer who played as a right winger in the Football League for Chesterfield, Mansfield Town and Coventry City. He was on the books of Derby County without representing them in the League, and played non-league football for clubs including Boston United and Kidderminster Harriers.

References

1936 births
2015 deaths
People from North East Derbyshire District
Footballers from Derbyshire
English footballers
Association football wingers
Chesterfield F.C. players
Boston United F.C. players
Mansfield Town F.C. players
Derby County F.C. players
Coventry City F.C. players
Kidderminster Harriers F.C. players
English Football League players